Enzo Ferrero (born January 3, 1953 in Campana) is a retired Argentine footballer who played for Boca Juniors in Argentina and Sporting de Gijón in Spain.

Ferrero started his professional playing career on September 9, 1971 in a 3–0 win over Los Andes. He went on to play 169 times for Boca Juniors scoring 39 goals.

He played for the Argentina youth team  in 1972 and made his debut for the Argentina national team in 1974.

In 1975, Ferrero joined Spanish side Sporting de Gijón where he became an idol, he played for the club until his retirement in 1985.

Ferrero was manager of UD Gijón Industrial for three years, where he led the team to promotion to the Spanish Tercera División. He has also managed Astur CF.

External links

Informe Xeneize profile 
 

1953 births
Living people
Sportspeople from Buenos Aires Province
Argentine footballers
Argentina international footballers
Association football wingers
Argentine Primera División players
Boca Juniors footballers
La Liga players
Sporting de Gijón players
Argentine expatriate footballers
Expatriate footballers in Spain
Argentine football managers